Events from the year 1987 in Kuwait.

Incumbents
Emir: Jaber Al-Ahmad Al-Jaber Al-Sabah
Prime Minister: Saad Al-Salim Al-Sabah

Events

Births

 1 January - Abdullah Al Buraiki.
 22 February - Talal Al Amer.
 10 August - Hameed Youssef.

References

 
Kuwait
Kuwait
Years of the 20th century in Kuwait
1980s in Kuwait